Petalos de Fuego is Brenda K. Starr's sixth studio album. It was released in the year 2000 on Platano records. Features the Top 20 hit title track.

Track listing

Charts

References

2000 albums
Brenda K. Starr albums